James Newsome House, also known as Wynnewood, is a historic plantation house located near Ahoskie, Hertford County, North Carolina.  It was built in the 1820s or 1830s, and is a two-story, three bay Federal style frame dwelling. It has a gable roof, beaded siding, and brick chimneys with free-standing stacks at the gable ends. Also on the property are the contributing slave cabin, smokehouse, large barn, and plantation office.

It was listed on the National Register of Historic Places in 1984.

References

Plantation houses in North Carolina
Houses on the National Register of Historic Places in North Carolina
Federal architecture in North Carolina
Houses in Hertford County, North Carolina
National Register of Historic Places in Hertford County, North Carolina
Slave cabins and quarters in the United States